Willsboro Congregational Church is a historic Congregational church on NY 22 in Willsboro, Essex County, New York.  It was built in 1834 and is a simple rectangular limestone building with a gable roof.  It features an engaged bell tower at the east gable end.

It was listed on the National Register of Historic Places in 1984.

References

United Church of Christ churches in New York (state)
Churches on the National Register of Historic Places in New York (state)
Georgian architecture in New York (state)
Churches completed in 1834
19th-century United Church of Christ church buildings
Churches in Essex County, New York
National Register of Historic Places in Essex County, New York